Prison Break: Season 3 & 4 is the second soundtrack of the American television series Prison Break, composed by Ramin Djawadi, bringing together music used for the third and fourth season. Released in June 2009, the album includes twenty-one music composed specially for seasons 3 and 4 of Prison Break.

The album contains only the creations of Ramin Djawadi, thus, all other music or songs used in the series are not present.

Track listing
All music by Ramin Djawadi.

Credits and personnel
Personnel adapted from the album liner notes.

 Geoff Bywater – Music Administrator
 Tom Cavanaugh – Music Business Affairs
 Ramin Djawadi – Arranger, Composer, Primary Artist, Producer
 Carol Farhat – Music Production Supervisor
 Bryce Jacobs – Personal Assistant
 David Klotz – Music Editor

 Erick Labson – Mastering
 Jeffrey Taylor Light – Public Relations
 Michelle Silverman – Music Supervisor
 Rob Simon – Technical Advisor
 Robert Townson – Executive Producer

References 

Album
2009 soundtrack albums
Ramin Djawadi soundtracks
Television soundtracks
Varèse Sarabande soundtracks